High-pressure electrolysis (HPE) is the electrolysis of water by decomposition of water (H2O) into oxygen (O2) and hydrogen gas (H2) due to the passing of an electric current through the water.

Approaches
As the required compression power for water is less than that for hydrogen-gas the water is pumped up to a high-pressure, in the other approach differential pressure is used.
There is also an importance for the electrolyser stacks to be able to accept a fluctuating electrical input, such as that found with renewable energy. This then enables the ability to help with grid balancing and energy storage.

Ultrahigh-pressure electrolysis
At ultra-high pressures the water solubility and cross-permeation across the membrane of H2 and O2 is affecting hydrogen purity, modified PEMs are used to reduce cross-permeation in combination with catalytic H2/O2 recombiners to maintain H2 levels in O2 and O2 levels in H2 at values compatible with hydrogen safety requirements.

Research

The US DOE believes that high-pressure electrolysis, supported by ongoing research and development, will contribute to the enabling and acceptance of technologies where hydrogen is the energy carrier between renewable energy resources and clean energy consumers.

High-pressure electrolysis is being investigated by the DOE for efficient production of hydrogen from water. The target total in 2005 is $4.75 per gge H2 at an efficiency of 64%. The total goal for the DOE in 2010 is $2.85 per gge H2 at an efficiency of 75%. As of 2005 the DOE provided a total of $1,563,882 worth of funding for research.

Mitsubishi is pursuing such technology with its High-pressure hydrogen energy generator (HHEG) project.

The Forschungszentrum Jülich, in Jülich Germany is currently researching the cost reduction of components used in high-pressure PEM electrolysis in the EKOLYSER  project. The primary goal of this research is to improve performance and gas purity, reduce cost and volume of expensive materials and reach the alternative energy targets set forth by the German government for 2050 in the Energy Concept published in 2010.

ThalesNano Energy released a lab-scale high pressure (100 bar) hydrogen generator as a replacement for hydrogen cylinders in chemistry laboratories.

Commercial Products
Honda installed its Smart Hydrogen Station (SHS) in Los Angeles for use by fuel cell automobiles.

See also
Regenerative fuel cell
Electrochemical engineering
High-temperature electrolysis

References

External links
High pressure electrolyzer
EC-supported STREP program on high pressure PEM water electrolysis

Hydrogen technologies
Electrolysis
Hydrogen production